Nicole El Karoui (née Schvartz) is a French mathematician and pioneer in the development of mathematical finance, born May 29, 1944, in Paris. She is considered one of the pioneers on the French school of mathematical finance and trained many engineers and scientists in this field.
She is Professor Emeritus of Applied Mathematics at Sorbonne University, and held professorship positions at the École Polytechnique and Université du Maine. Her research has contributed to the application of probability and stochastic differential equations to modeling and risk management in financial markets.

Teaching
The reputation of Professor El Karoui's classes is such that Wall Street Journal opines that there may be too many of her students in important positions handling financial derivatives.
In an interview with the Wall Street Journal, Rama Cont, a well-known mathematician, described a degree with Ms. El Karoui's name on it as "the magic word that opened doors for young people."

El Karoui was the co-director, with Marc Yor  and Gilles Pagès, of the Masters program in Probability & Finance, jointly operated by École Polytechnique and the Pierre and Marie Curie University (Paris VI), which she co-founded with Hélyette Geman. This program, usually called "DEA El Karoui", is one of the most prestigious programs in quantitative finance in the world and No 1 in France.

Scientific contributions

Nicole El Karoui's research is focused on probability theory, stochastic control theory and mathematical finance. Her contributions focused on the mathematical theory of  stochastic control, backward stochastic differential equations and their application in mathematical finance.

She is particularly known for her work on the robustness of the Black-Scholes hedging strategy, superhedging of contingent claims and the change of numéraire method for option pricing.

Among El Karoui's contributions to mathematical finance is her elegant formula for expressing the covariance relationship between the futures price and the forward price of an asset.  The El Karoui futures-forward covariance formula states

Selected publications

Awards
Professor El Karoui is a Chevalier de l'ordre de la légion d'honneur.

References

External links
 The mathematics genealogy project http://genealogy.math.ndsu.nodak.edu/id.php?id=57381
 The City Genius Of France http://www.lexpress.fr/emploi-carriere/les-g-eacute-nies-fran-ccedil-ais-de-la-city_479283.html

Living people
École Normale Supérieure alumni
French women mathematicians
Financial economists
1944 births
Academic staff of École Polytechnique